Spijkenisse is a city in the province of South Holland, Netherlands. Following an administrative reform in 2015, it is part of the municipality of Nissewaard, and has a population of 72,500. It is part of the Greater Rotterdam area.

History

Archaeological evidence suggests that the area around Spijkenisse has been inhabited for several thousand years. The area's prehistoric inhabitants depended on fishing in the Maas and hunting in the surrounding swamps for sustenance. Spijkenisse also has an anthem, the song is called "Spijkenisse" by Rik Hoogendoorn. The song was released in 2012 and is very popular amongst people who live in Spijkenisse.

The oldest known reference to the name Spickenisse is in a source from 1231. Spijkenisse is a portmanteau of the words  (spit) and nesse (nose) meaning "pointy nose." The name is a reference to the settlement's location on a spit of land protruding into the river.

Spijkenisse formed as a farming and fishing village on a creek along the Oude Maas. It originally belonged to the Lord of Putten (whose coat of arms is now used by the city) but in 1459 the fiefdom of Putten, including Spijkenisse, was transferred to Philip III, Duke of Burgundy. In 1581, after the Dutch declaration of independence, the area came under the control of the States of Holland and West Friesland.

In the 16th century the village suffered several floods. In the 17th and 18th centuries it endured destructive fires which hampered its economic growth. In the 20th century Spijkenisse heavily urbanised as part of the Greater Rotterdam area. Contemporary Spijkenisse includes the communities of Hekelingen, Den Hoek, and Beerenplaat.

Transport
Spijkenisse has a connection to the city of Rotterdam by Rotterdam Metro lines C and D, through Spijkenisse Centrum, Heemraadlaan and De Akkers stations. The metro is operated by RET.

On 2 November 2020, at about 00:30, a train ran through buffers at the end of the line and was saved from plunging 10 metres by the "Whale tails" sculpture.

There are also several bus services operated by EBS and 1 line of Connexxion to Ouddorp.

In 2011, the town built seven bridges designed by Robin Stam, replicating Robert Kalina's fictional designs on the euro banknotes.

Districts

Health
 Spijkenisse Medisch Centrum (former Ruwaard van Putten hospital)

Schools

Primary schools

Secondary school

Notable residents 

 Jan Campert  (1902 in Spijkenisse –  1943) a journalist, theater critic and writer 
 Marleen de Pater-van der Meer (1950 in Hekelingen – 2015) a Dutch politician
 Jan Bechtum (born 1958 in Spijkenisse) a Dutch guitarist and composer
 Erik de Jong (born 1961 in Spijkenisse) known as Spinvis, a Dutch one-man music project
 Medy van der Laan (born 1968 in Spijkenisse) a retired Dutch politician
 Björn Franken (born 1983 in Spijkenisse) known as Vato Gonzalez, DJ and producer
 Nick van de Wall (born 1987 in Spijkenisse) known as Afrojack, DJ and producer
 Duncan Laurence (born 1994 in Spijkenisse) singer, winner of the Eurovision Song Contest 2019

Sport
 Bram Groeneweg (1905 in Spijkenisse – 1988) a Dutch long-distance runner, competed in the marathon at the 1928 Summer Olympics
 Emiel Mellaard (born 1966 in Spijkenisse) is a retired Dutch long jump record holder
 Joeri de Groot (born 1977 in Spijkenisse) a Dutch rower, competed at the 2004 Summer Olympics
 Patrick van Luijk (born 1984 in Spijkenisse) a Dutch sprinter
 Martijn Barto (born 1984 in Spijkenisse) a Dutch professional footballer with over 200 club caps

International relations
Spijkenisse is twinned with the following cities:

Gallery

References

External links 

Municipalities of the Netherlands disestablished in 2015
Former municipalities of South Holland
Populated places in South Holland
Nissewaard